Papyrus 96 (in the Gregory-Aland numbering), designated by 𝔓96, is a copy of the New Testament in Greek and Coptic. It is a diglot papyrus manuscript of the Gospel of Matthew. The surviving texts of Matthew are verses 3:10-12 (Coptic, Greek lost), 3:13-15 (Greek, Coptic lost). The manuscript paleographically has been assigned to the 6th century.

Text 
The Greek text of this manuscript probably is a representative of the Alexandrian text-type, though the extant portion is too fragmentary for certainty. It is still not assigned to any of Aland's Categories of New Testament manuscripts.

 Location
The manuscript is currently housed at the Österreichische Nationalbibliothek (Pap. K. 7244) at Vienna.

See also 

 List of New Testament papyri
 Coptic versions of the Bible

References 

New Testament papyri
Greek-Coptic diglot manuscripts of the New Testament
6th-century biblical manuscripts
Biblical manuscripts of the Austrian National Library
Gospel of Matthew papyri